Statistics of Czechoslovak First League in the 1990–91 season. Roman Kukleta was the league's top scorer with 17 goals.

Overview
It was contested by 16 teams, and Sparta Prague won the championship.

Stadia and locations

League standings

Results

Top goalscorers

References

Czechoslovakia - List of final tables (RSSSF)

Czechoslovak First League seasons
Czech
1990–91 in Czechoslovak football